Andrea Heuser (born October 5, 1972, in Cologne) is a German writer, poet, translator and literary scholar.

Life and work 
Andrea Heuser has studied German philology, politics and comparative religious studies in Cologne and Bonn. In 2008 she earned a doctorate with a dissertation on German-Jewish-literature. Her study was published in 2011 with the title Vom Anderen zum Gegenüber. „Jüdischkeit“ in der deutschen Gegenwartsliteratur (From the Other to the vis-à-vis. “Jewishness“ in German contemporary literature). Andrea Heuser is herself active in the field of literature, with poetry, prose, libretti and musical theatre. She had teaching assignments at the University of Cologne and the University of Television and Film Munich. In the Munich poetic society „Lyrik Kabinett“ she initiated the Autorenwerkstatt (workshop for authors) and the project Lust auf Lyrik Gedichte an Schulen. (In the mood for poetry. Poems in schools). In addition to that she moderated a series of poetry events named Lyrik-Plattform in Munich together with Karin Fellner, Augusta Laar and Gabriele Trinckler. Andrea Heuser is member of the poetry groups Lyrinx and Reimfrei. On the website lyrikline of the Berliner Literaturwerkstatt, Andrea Heuser's poems can be listened to, as well as her translations of the works of the Lebanese poet Hanane Aad. In 2004 her poems were published at onomato Verlag in Düsseldorf. In 2014 her debut novel was published at Dumont in Cologne.

Awards 
 2006: Award Preis der Bodenseeländer (IBK) für Lyrik 
 2007: Sponsorship grant Wolfgang Weyrauch Prize 
 2007: Grant of the Hermann-Sudermann-Stiftung für Autoren 
 2009: Sponsorship award of the Literaturpreis Wartholz 
 2009: Literary grant Literaturpreis der Landeshauptstadt München 
 2010: Working grant from the Deutschen Literaturfonds for her novel Augustas Garten 
 2012: Finalist at Lyrikpreis Meran 
 2016: Literature Scholarship of Bavaria for the novel project Das Winkelhaus

Poems set to music 
 2000: by edition zeitklang 
 2002: by amphion-records 
 2007: by Eichborn Lido

Publications (selection) 
 2004: vor dem verschwinden (before disappearing) onomato Verlag, Düsseldorf 2008  
 2014: Augustas Garten (Augusta's garden) Dumont, Cologne 2014, 
 2021: Wenn wir heimkehren. (When we come home) Dumont, Cologne 2021,

Performance of works (selection) 
 2002: Dr. Popels fiese Falle (Dr. Bogey's nasty trap, Music: Moritz Eggert), Children's opera. Premiere 2002 at Oper Frankfurt, resumption 2007 at Oper Hamburg. 
 2007: Rotkäppchen, lauf! (Run, Little Red Riding Hood!), Musical theatre play. Performances 2007 at theatres in Osnabrück (premiere), Munich and Kassel. 
 2012: All diese Tage (All these days, Music: Moritz Eggert), Opera. Premiere 2012 at Theater Bremen.

References

External links 

 
 Review on Vor dem Verschwinden in the Frankfurter Allgemeine Zeitung 
 Andrea Heuser in Perlentaucher 
 Andrea Heuser in Poetenladen 

1972 births
Living people
Writers from Cologne
People from the Rhine Province
German women novelists
21st-century German women writers
21st-century German poets
German women poets
German librettists
Modernist poets
Modernist women writers
German translators
University of Cologne alumni
University of Television and Film Munich alumni
21st-century translators